Ndwa'ngith was apparently an Australian language once spoken in the Cape York Peninsula of Queensland.  It is undocumented, without even word lists to record it.

Sutton (2001) distinguishes Ndwa'ngith from the similar-sounding Northern Paman languages Ndra'ngith, Ndrangith, and Ntrwa'ngayth.

References

Extinct languages of Queensland
Northern Paman languages
Unclassified languages of Australia